Recaraceria is a genus of moths belonging to the subfamily Olethreutinae of the family Tortricidae.

Species
Recaraceria hormoterma (Meyrick, 1938)
Recaraceria carceraria (Meyrick, 1913)

Etymology
The genus name is a combination of letters using those of the name of the type-species of the genus (Recaraceria carceraria) plus an extra e.

See also
List of Tortricidae genera

References

External links
tortricidae.com

Olethreutini
Moth genera